Plymouth is a town in Box Elder County, Utah, United States. The population was 414 at the 2010 census.

Geography
According to the United States Census Bureau, the town has a total area of 0.5 square mile (1.4 km2), all land.

Demographics

As of the census of 2000, there were 328 people, 105 households, and 89 families residing in the town. The population density was 607.0 people per square mile (234.5/km2). There were 114 housing units at an average density of 211.0 per square mile (81.5/km2). The racial makeup of the town was 99.09% White, 0.30% Native American, and 0.61% from two or more races. Hispanic or Latino of any race were 1.52% of the population.

There were 105 households, out of which 51.4% had children under the age of 18 living with them, 70.5% were married couples living together, 10.5% had a female householder with no husband present, and 15.2% were non-families. 15.2% of all households were made up of individuals, and 7.6% had someone living alone who was 65 years of age or older. The average household size was 3.12 and the average family size was 3.45.

In the town, the population was spread out, with 36.0% under the age of 18, 12.8% from 18 to 24, 24.1% from 25 to 44, 18.3% from 45 to 64, and 8.8% who were 65 years of age or older. The median age was 27 years. For every 100 females, there were 91.8 males. For every 100 females age 18 and over, there were 85.8 males.

The median income for a household in the town was $41,250, and the median income for a family was $48,750. Males had a median income of $39,250 versus $16,607 for females. The per capita income for the town was $15,377. About 7.1% of families and 9.0% of the population were below the poverty line, including 12.3% of those under age 18 and 9.1% of those age 65 or over.

References

Towns in Box Elder County, Utah
Towns in Utah
Populated places established in 1869
1869 establishments in Utah Territory